Heiner Carow (19 September 1929 – 1 February 1997) was a German film director and screenwriter. His 1986 film So Many Dreams was entered into the 37th Berlin International Film Festival. The following year, he was a member of the jury at the 38th Berlin International Film Festival. In 1990, his film Coming Out won the Silver Bear for an outstanding artistic contribution at the 40th Berlin International Film Festival. Carow died in 1997, aged 67. His grave is located in Babelsberg.

Selected filmography
 Sheriff Teddy (1957)
 Sie nannten ihn Amigo (1959)
 Die Hochzeit von Länneken (1964)
 The Legend of Paul and Paula (1973)
 So Many Dreams (1986)
 Coming Out (1989)
  (1992, TV film)
 The Mistake (1992)
 Vater Mutter Mörderkind (1993, TV film)
  (1996, TV film)

References

External links

1929 births
1997 deaths
People from Rostock
People from the Free State of Mecklenburg-Schwerin
Mass media people from Mecklenburg-Western Pomerania
Recipients of the Heinrich Greif Prize
German male writers